Aurelio Campa Serrano (10 May 1933 – 18 April 2020) was a Spanish professional footballer who played as a defender.

Career
Born in Madrid, Campa played for Real Madrid, CD Badajoz, Las Palmas and Granada.

Later life and death
He died on 18 April 2020, aged 86.

References

1933 births
2020 deaths
Spanish footballers
Real Madrid CF players
CD Badajoz players
UD Las Palmas players
Granada CF footballers
La Liga players
Segunda División players
Association football defenders